Antun Mihalović (17 July 1868 – 21 September 1949) was a Croatian politician. He served as ban of Croatia from 29 June 1917 until 20 January 1919. He was a member of a noble family Mihalović, whose oldest known member (Demeter pl. Mihalović) came from Macedonia to Croatia (to the city of Orahovica) in 1733.

References

External links
 List of Croatian bans at Rulers.org

1868 births
1949 deaths
People from Feričanci
Bans of Croatia
Croatian Austro-Hungarians
19th-century Croatian nobility
20th-century Croatian nobility